Real Saltillo Soccer is a football club that plays in the Mexican football league system Segunda División Profesional. The club is based in Saltillo, Coahuila, Mexico.

History
The club was founded in July 2008 with a base mainly of players from Saltillo and cities around Coahuila. The club plays in the city of Piedras Negras, Coahuila. That same year the club joined the 2nd Division. After Clausura 2013 season, they were dissolved on April 29, 2013

See also
Football in Mexico
Saltillo Soccer

Association football clubs established in 2008
2008 establishments in Mexico
Saltillo
Defunct football clubs in Coahuila
Defunct football clubs in Mexico